The 2015 Hartford Hawks baseball team will represent the University of Hartford during the 2015 NCAA Division I baseball season. The Hawks will play their home games at Fiondella Field as a member of the America East Conference. They will be led by head coach Justin Blood, in his 4th season at Hartford.

Previous season
In 2014, the Hawks finished the season 2nd in the America East with a record of 31–23, 16–7 in conference play. They qualified for the 2014 America East Conference baseball tournament and were eliminated in the semifinals. They failed to qualify for the 2014 NCAA Division I baseball tournament.

Personnel

Roster

Coaching staff

Schedule

All rankings from Collegiate Baseball.

References

Hartford Hawks
Hartford Hawks baseball seasons
Hartford baseball